Anjanette Comer (born August 7, 1939) is an American actress.

Early years
Born in Dawson, Texas, to Rufus Franklin Comer, Jr., and Nola Dell "Sue" (Perkins) Comer, she attended Dawson High School. She gained acting experience at the Pasadena Playhouse.

Career
Comer's first major television credit was a guest appearance in a 1963 episode of Gunsmoke titled "Carter Caper", followed by roles in several other dramatic series of the 1960s, such as Dr. Kildare and Bonanza. In 1964, she earned an Emmy nomination for Outstanding Performance in a Supporting Role by an Actress for her work on an episode on Arrest and Trial.

She made her film debut as the female lead in the 1964 comedy Quick, Before It Melts followed by a memorable role in the 1965 satire The Loved One, playing a seductive mortician who offers Robert Morse a choice for his uncle's funeral arrangements of "Inhumement, entombment, inurnment, immurement? Some people just lately have preferred ensarcophagusment."

Although Comer was cast opposite Michael Caine for Funeral in Berlin and appeared in publicity stills (she can be seen with Caine and Eva Renzi in a photograph on the DVD release), she had to be replaced because of illness. She had another leading role as a love interest of Marlon Brando and John Saxon in The Appaloosa (1966). The film, shot on location in Mexico, presented Anjanette as a Mexican peasant girl, a role she repeated in Guns for San Sebastian (1968). In between, she starred in Banning.

Comer's movie activity dropped off in 1970 after she played Ruth in the film version of John Updike's Rabbit, Run (1970). She later claimed she let her love life interfere with her work. Comer's later films include The Firechasers (1971) and Fire Sale (1977), and the TV  movie The Long Summer of George Adams (1983).

Personal life
From 1976 to 1983, she was married to Robert Klane; the marriage ended in divorce.

Select TV and filmography

 My Three Sons as Janie Stempel (1 episode, 1962)
 Arrest and Trial as Annabelle (1 episode, 1963)
 Ben Casey (1 episode, 1963)
 Gunsmoke as Cara Miles (1 episode, 1963)
 Quick, Before It Melts (1964) as Tiara Marshall
 Combat! as Annette (Episode: "Weep No More", 1964)
 Bonanza as Joan Wingate (Episode: "Love Me Not", 1964)
 Dr. Kildare as Carol Montgomery (2 episodes, 1964)
 The Loved One (1965) as Aimee Thanatogenous
 The Appaloosa (1966) as Trini
 Banning (1967) as Carol Lindquist
 In Enemy Country (1968) as Denise
 La Bataille de San Sebastian (1968) as Kinita
 The Young Lawyers (1969, TV) as Bonnie Baron
 Love American Style as Billie Joe (segment 'Love and the Roommate', 1969)
 Rabbit, Run (1970) as Ruth
 The Mod Squad (1 episode, 1970)
 Then Came Bronson as Vhea Samos (1 episode, 1970)
 Lady Boss (1971) TV episode as (segment "Love and the Hiccups")
 Dr. Simon Locke (1 episode)
 Banyon (1971, TV) as Diane Jennings
 The Most Deadly Game as Gretchen (1 episode, 1971)
 The Firechasers (1971) as Toby Collins
 Five Desperate Women as Lucy (1971 TV movie)
 Blood Feast as Cathy (1972 movie)
 Mannix as Gina Hunter (1 episode, 1972)
 Columbo: Étude in Black (1972, TV) as Jenifer Welles
 The Baby (1973) as Ann Gentry
 Search as Anne Ramon (1 episode, 1973)
 Police Story as Constantina (2 episodes, 1974)
 The Blue Knight (1 episode, 1975)
 Barbary Coast as Mary Louise (1 episode, 1975)
 S.W.A.T. as Alicia Woodward (2 episodes, 1975)
 Harry O as Grace Duvall (1 episode, 1975)
 The Manchu Eagle Murder Caper Mystery (1975) as Arlevia Jessup
 Petrocelli as Mary Thorpe (1 episode, 1975)
 Lepke (1975) as Bernice Meyer
 Baretta as Det. Ann Harley (1 episode, 1976)
 Jigsaw John as Mavis Bellamy (1 episode, 1976)
 Fire Sale (1977) as Marion Fikus
 Dead of Night (1977 film) (1977, TV) as Alexis
 Barnaby Jones as Vivian Harper (1 episode, 1980)
 The Long Summer of George Adams (1982, TV) as Venida
 Hotel as Maggie (1 episode, 1988)
 Jake and the Fatman as Vera Lake (3 episodes, 1991)
 Netherworld (1992) as Mrs. Palmer
 Streets of Laredo (1995) TV miniseries as Beulah
 The Underneath (1995) as Mrs. Chambers
 Profiler as Barbara Henkley (1 episode, 1999)

References

External links

1939 births
Living people
People from Dawson, Texas
Actresses from Texas
American film actresses
American television actresses
20th-century American actresses
21st-century American women